is a railway station on the Rias Line in the city of Kuji, Iwate, Japan, operated by the third-sector railway operator Sanriku Railway Company.

Lines

Station layout
Rikuchū-Ube Station has one side platform serving a single bi-directional track. The station is unattended.

Adjacent stations

History
Rikuchū-Ube Station opened on 20 July 1975 as a station on the Japan National Railways (JNR) Kuji Line.  On 1 April 1984, upon the privatization of the Kuji Line, the station came under the control of the Sanriku Railway Company. Minami-Rias Line, a segment of Yamada Line, and Kita-Rias Line constitute Rias Line on 23 March 2019. Accordingly, this station became an intermediate station of Rias Line.

Surrounding area
National Route 45
Ube Post Office

See also
 List of railway stations in Japan

References

External links

  

Rias Line
Railway stations in Iwate Prefecture
Railway stations in Japan opened in 1975
Kuji, Iwate